The Second Legislative Assembly of Uttar Pradesh (a.k.a.Second Vidhan Sabha of Uttar Pradesh) was constituted on 1 Apr 1957 as a result of 1957 Uttar Pradesh Legislative Assembly election which was concluded on 25 Feb 1957. The Second Legislative Assembly had 430 elected and 1 nominated MLAs. The assembly was in house for full term of five years before being dissolved on 6 Mar 1962.

Important members
Sampurnanand was the second Chief Minister of Uttar Pradesh. He succeeded Govind Ballabh Pant of his party and served as a Chief Minister from 1954 to 1960. In 1960, due to a political crisis initiated by Kamlapati Tripathi and Chandra Bhanu Gupta, Sampurnanand was  asked to quit the post of Chief Minister and was sent to Rajasthan as the Governor. Following were the important members of the Second Legislative Assembly of Uttar Pradesh.

Party wise strength
As of 10 Apr 1957,  total 430 MLAs were elected from 341 constituencies of Uttar Pradesh.

Electors

List of constituencies and elected members

See also

 Government of Uttar Pradesh
 List of Chief Ministers of Uttar Pradesh
 Politics of India
 Sixteenth Legislative Assembly of Uttar Pradesh
 Uttar Pradesh Legislative Assembly

References 

Indian politics articles by importance
Uttar Pradesh Legislative Assembly
Uttar Pradesh MLAs 1957–1962